Yoxford is

Yoxford, an English village
as well as, 

 Yoxford, South Africa
 The Yoxford Boys, U.S. Army Air Force/U.S. Air Force 357th Fighter Group